Oliver Richard James (born 7 October 1990) is a Welsh cricketer.  James is a right-handed batsman who bowls right-arm off break.  He was born in Neath, Glamorgan.

James made his debut for Wales Minor Counties in the 2008 MCCA Knockout Trophy against Dorset.  He played Minor counties cricket for Wales Minor Counties in 2008 and 2009, making a total of six Minor Counties Championship appearances and three MCCA Knockout Trophy appearances.  In 2010, he represented Herefordshire in a single MCCA Knockout Trophy match against Oxfordshire.

While studying for his degree in Business Economics and Finance at Loughborough University, James made his first-class debut for Loughborough MCCU against Leicestershire in 2011.  In this match, which is his only first-class appearance to date, saw him dismiss James Taylor, only after Taylor had compiled his career best score of 237.  With the bat, James scored 8 runs in Loughborough's first-innings, before being dismissed by Sam Cliff, while in their second-innings he wasn't required to bat.

It is rumoured that Oliver James won Mr Usk in 2010, however the result was contentious with a disputed swimwear round.

Oliver was awarded the London Market Forum 'Broking Professional of the Year' in 2018 but, after an inquiry into the votes and voting process, the award was subsequently rescinded.

Oliver James is also a keen ornithologist.

Honours
Mr. Usk
Runner-up: 2010

London Market Forum 'Broking Professional of the Year'
Winner: 2018 (later rescinded)

References

External links
Oliver James at ESPNcricinfo
Oliver James at CricketArchive

1990 births
Living people
Cricketers from Neath
Alumni of Loughborough University
Welsh cricketers
Wales National County cricketers
Herefordshire cricketers
Loughborough MCCU cricketers